Stormtrooper or storm trooper may refer to:

Military
Stormtroopers (Imperial Germany), specialist soldier of the German Army in World War I
Sturmabteilung (SA) or Storm Detachment, a paramilitary organization of the German Nazi Party
8th Infantry Division (Philippines) or Storm Trooper Division, a Philippine Army unit
The term is sometimes applied to Canadian soldiers of the First World War

Other uses
Stormtrooper (Star Wars), a fictional soldier from the Star Wars universe
Stormtroopers (Transformers), a fictional group from the Transformers series
Stormtrooper, an American Nazi Party magazine (circa the 1960s)
Stormtroopers, fictional soldiers in the Imperial Guard of Warhammer 40,000

See also
Shock troops, commandos or special forces in general
Stormtroopers of Death, a crossover thrash band
Sturmtruppen (disambiguation)